This is a list of roads in Pune, a city in the state of Maharashtra in India.

References

Transport in Pune
Roads in Maharashtra